Becky Jones, better known as Saint Saviour, is an English musician from Stockton-On-Tees.  Formerly of the electro band The RGBs, she toured with Groove Armada as their lead singer between 2009 and 2012, whilst also producing her own solo music as Saint Saviour from 2010. After releasing two EPs, her debut album Union came out in June 2012. Her song "This Ain't No Hymn" then appeared in the 2012 trailer for the film Miss Bala.

Saint Saviour's second solo album In the Seams was released on 3 November 2014. The album was produced by fellow Northern English singer-songwriter Bill Ryder-Jones and features the Manchester Camerata Orchestra.

History 
As she writes on her official website, "I’ve been hanging about the periphery of music for a few years now, mainly collaborating with electronic producers, writing really positive, upbeat pop/dance tunes." Originally from Stockton-on-Tees, she moved to London in 2003. She adopted the name 'Saint Saviour' after seeing it regularly while running in the St Saviour's Dock area of London. She was lead singer in the RGBs, who toured with Groove Armada, before joining the latter. In 2010, Saint Saviour provided a vocal collaboration for Groove Armada on their album Black Light, and toured as the band's singer.

She subsequently launched her career as a solo artist, supporting Hurts on tour, in 2010 and releasing two EPs (Anatomy and Suukei). She has since released a first album Union; a second album In the Seams in November 2014 which sees Saint Saviour take a more honest and personal approach to songwriting with a stripped back sound and strings played by the Manchester Camerata Orchestra, and her latest album, Tomorrow Again, released on 4 September 2020.

Her voice has drawn comparisons with Kate Bush, Elizabeth Fraser, and Sinéad O'Connor.

She is also the head of songwriting at Tech Music School in London.

Discography

Studio albums

EPs

Singles
"Love Will Tear Us Apart" (2008), Bang The Box
"Woman Scorned" (2010), Euphonios

References

External links
 
 

Year of birth missing (living people)
Living people
English women singer-songwriters